The bocadillo or bocata, in Spain, is a sandwich made with Spanish bread, usually a baguette or similar type of bread, cut lengthwise. Traditionally seen as a humble food, its low cost has allowed it to evolve over time into an iconic piece of cuisine. In Spain, they are often eaten in cafes and tapas bars.

Some bocadillos are seasoned with sauces like mayonnaise, aioli, ketchup, mustard or tomato sauce. They are usually served with cold beer or red wine, drinks, coffee and a portion of tapas. Different types of bocadillos are available in different parts of Spain, such as the serranito, almussafes and esgarrat.

Types
There is a wide variety of bocadillos in Spain, but the most typical can be pointed out. Bocadillos can also be found in northern Morocco.

Omelette 

 Spanish omelette (prepared with or without onion)
 Campera omelette (prepared with potatoes, green pepper and chorizo)
 Jamon omelette (prepared with jamon instead of using potatoes)
 Cheese omelette
 Courgette omelette
 French omelette
 Garlic omelette (prepared with young garlic, green garlic)
 Bean omelette
 Aubergine omelette
 Spinach omelette
 Tuna fish omelette

Cold meat  

Jamón - Spanish dry-cured ham, typically served with olive oil
 Boiled ham with cheese
 Bacon with cheese
 Mortadella (with or without olives)
 Salchichón
 Salami
 Paté, Pâté
 Sobrassada with cheese

Cheese  

 Cheese
 Fresh cheese with oil and tomato
 Cheese spread with anchovies
 Sliced Tasmanian feta cheese

Vegetarian

 Tomato and olive oil, Pa amb tomàquet
 Pisto (prepared with courgette, tomato sauce, green pepper, pine nut)
 Vegetarian (prepared with lettuce, tomato, olives and mayonnaise)

Sausage 

 Chistorra
 Longaniza or blanco (white)
 Chorizo or rojo (red)
 Morcilla or negro (black)
 Blanco y negro (white and black, prepared with longaniza and morcilla)
 Frankfurt

Meat  

 Pork fillet (with green pepper and french fries)
 Horse meat
 Pechuga (Chicken filet)
 Pepito (Beef meat)

Egg 

 Fried egg (other ingredient normally accompanied)
 Revuelto de huevos, Scrambled eggs

Fish  

 Calamares, Fried calamares
 Puntillas or Puntillitas (Battered and fried baby squid)
 Calamares en su tinta (Squid stewed in its own black ink)
 Tuna fish with olives
 Sardines
 Cuttlefish
 Smoked salmon with boiled eggs

Sweet  

 Chocolate

Other  

 Brascada (prepared with beef fillet, Spanish ham and fried onions)
 Kike (prepared with pork fillet, Spanish ham, french fries, fried egg, fried onions and mayonnaise)
 Pascuala (prepared with horse fillet, bacon, tomato sauce)
 Pascuala especial (prepared with pork fillet, bacon, cheese and tomato sauce)
 Cofrade
 Chivito
 Emanuele (prepared with chorizo, green pepper, cheese and alioli sauce)
 Spanish Bocadillo (prepared with Spanish omelette, bacon and fresh tomatoe in slices)
 Portuguese Bocadillo (prepared with pork sausage, fries and green pepper)
 Tumbadito (prepared with turkey fillet, green pepper, cheese and alioli)

See also
 List of sandwiches - Cuban sandwich

References

Spanish cuisine
Sandwiches
Olive dishes
Fish dishes
Egg sandwiches
Ham dishes
Portuguese cuisine
Sausage dishes